Sub Oslo is an improvisational band from Denton, Texas, that plays psychedelic/ambient dub.  The band was formed in 1996 by Miguel Veliz and Quincy Holloway, who were roommates at the time.  Since then the band has expanded to include a total of eight members.  When Sub Oslo performs live, they have a visual artist working live to display visualizations projected onto a screen, and incorporate a mix engineer, allowing performances to be different each time.  Sub Oslo has toured the West Coast, Japan, and has also had their music featured in the Xbox videogame Brute Force.  They have also performed alongside influential dub artists such as Mad Professor, Steel Pulse and The Roots.  They also performed with less known artists such as Fugazi, Raz Mesanai, the Make-up, Yeti, Him, June of 44, and DJ Krush.

Discography

12'' EP - (self titled) (out of print)
Prisoner of Dub
Science Dub
Dubalicious

CD - Dubs in the key of Life
Stratospheric Penetration
Celestial Dub
Melafrica
Reel to Reel Dub
Mi Familia Re-Dub
Washes of Dub

CD - The Rites of Dub
Goatsucker Dub
Sep Dub
Control This
Sub Oslo vs. Bookshelf Speakers
Dark and Lovely
13th Hour Dub

Band members
Quincy Holloway - Drums
Miguel Veliz - Bass
Frank Cervantez - Guitar
Moses Mayo|Eyad Kaileh - Percussion
Brandan Uribe - Flute/Percussion/Piano
Alán Uribe - Clavinet/Synth/Melodica
John Nuckels - Mixing/effects/samples
Paul Baker - Live Visuals/Video artist

References

Musical groups from Denton, Texas
Dub musical groups